An Ecuadorian passport is an identity document issued to citizens of Ecuador for the purpose of international travel. It is issued by the Registro Civil, Identificación y Cedulación (Civil Registry) in Ecuador, and the Minister of Foreign Affair Embassies & Consulates abroad. The Ecuadorian passport is a type of Andean passport, allowing for free rights of movement and residence in any of the Andean Community members. The Ecuador passport is normally issued for 10 years and has the benefit of having "visa-free" status for Andean Community and Mercosur members nations, and several Centro America nations.

They are also given a document called an Andean Card at any Andean airport, with which they can travel freely throughout the territory of the Andean Community.

Since October 2020 in the city of Quito, a new biometric passport has been implemented.

See also
 Visa requirements for Ecuadorian citizens
List of passports

References

Passports by country
Government of Ecuador